Heinz Willy Gustav Hopf (November 11, 1934 – January 23, 2001) was a Swedish actor.

He was born in Stockholm but moved to Lund where he studied at Lund University. He later became a regular actor at the Dramaten theater in Stockholm. Internationally, he is best known for playing the pimp in Thriller – A Cruel Picture (1974).

Heinz Hopf died from laryngeal cancer in 2001.

Filmography

References

External links
 

1934 births
2001 deaths
Lund University alumni
Swedish male film actors
Swedish male stage actors
Swedish male television actors
20th-century Swedish male actors
Deaths from cancer in Sweden
Deaths from laryngeal cancer